An election to Kildare County Council took place in 1925 as part of that year's Irish local elections.

Results by party

Results by Electoral Area

Athy

References

1925 Irish local elections
1925